Khoijuman  is a small village situated within the Bishnupur district in the Indian state of Manipur. It has population of about 3000 (approx) with 1460 are males and 1490 are females.

Tourist spots
In this village there is one Laikon where everyone of this village celebrates Lai Haraoba annually in  Lamta-Sajibu(according to Meetei Calendar which occurred in month March–April of Gregorian calendar).

Demographic and Geography
khoijuman is further divided into 4 sectors 
 Khoijuman khunou
 Khoijuman khullen
 Khoijuman keithel(market)
 Khoijuman Kabui

It has literacy of about 77% 
Females = 68%
Males = 86% .

Sports
Nanao Thokchom (born 8 January 1991) is an Indian boxer from Khoijuman Maning Leikai village in Bishnupur district of Manipur.

See also
Bishnupur
Ningthoukhong
Nanao Thokchom

References

External links
Khoijuman youth show the path : 15th dec14 ~ E-Pao! Headlines, http://e-pao.net/GP.asp?src=6..151214.dec14
Extended weather forecast for Khoijuman khullen: 15 days forecast for Khoijuman khullen, Manipur, https://www.skymetweather.com/forecast/weather/india/manipur/bishnupur/khoijuman%20khullen/extended-forecast

Villages in Bishnupur district